Arnold Temanfo (born 3 June 1993) is a French professional footballer who plays as a right-back for Annecy.

Career
Temanfo is a youth product of the academies of Red Star F.C., Antony Sport, Entente SSG, Châteauroux, Real Zaragoza and Paris FC. He began his senior career in amateur clubs in France with La Rochelle in 2012. He moved to Cozes in 2015, and followed that up with stints with Chauray and Lusitanos Saint-Maur, before moving to Belgium with Liège in 2020. In the summer of 2020, he moved to Sète. On 27 June 2021, he transferred to the Championnat National side Annecy. He helped Annecy come in second place in the 2021–22 Championnat National season and earned promotion into the Ligue 2. He made his professional debut with Annecy in a 2–1 Ligue 2 loss to Niort on 30 July 2022, scoring his sides only goal in the 63rd minute.

Personal life
Born in France, Temanfo is of Cameroonian descent.

References

External links
 
 

1993 births
Living people
Footballers from Paris
French footballers
French sportspeople of Cameroonian descent
ES La Rochelle players
US Lusitanos Saint-Maur players
RFC Liège players
FC Sète 34 players
FC Annecy players
Ligue 2 players
Championnat National players
Championnat National 2 players
Championnat National 3 players
Belgian National Division 1 players
Association football fullbacks
French expatriate footballers
French expatriates in Belgium
Expatriate footballers in Belgium
French expatriate sportspeople in Spain
Expatriate footballers in Spain